Bentley Crossing Halt was a small railway station on the West Riding and Grimsby Railway line between Doncaster and Carcroft & Adwick-le-Street. It was a workman's halt built in 1914 to serve the community of Bentley, near Doncaster, South Yorkshire, England at the point where the main line crosses the road through the village on the level. The road links Bentley with York Bar. The station consisted of wooden platforms with wooden buildings to act as waiting shelter and office.

The station was closed around 1943 and little can now be seen of the buildings (a regular fault with wooden built stations), however the Bentley (South Yorkshire) railway station was built on the same site.

References 

The Railways of South Yorkshire, C.T.Goode, Dalesman Publishing. 

Disused railway stations in Doncaster
Railway stations in Great Britain opened in 1914
Railway stations in Great Britain closed in 1943
Former West Riding and Grimsby Railway stations